Alchemical symbols, originally devised as part of alchemy, were used to denote some elements and some compounds until the 18th century. Although notation was partly standardized, style and symbol varied between alchemists.  Lüdy-Tenger published an inventory of 3,695 symbols and variants, and that was not exhaustive, omitting for example many of the symbols used by Isaac Newton. This page therefore lists only the most common symbols.

Three primes
According to Paracelsus (1493–1541), the three primes or tria prima – of which material substances are immediately composed – are:
 Sulfur or soul, the principle of combustibility: 🜍
 Mercury or spirit, the principle of fusibility and volatility: ☿
 Salt or body, the principle of non-combustibility and non-volatility: 🜔

Four basic elements

Western alchemy makes use of the four classical elements.  The symbols used for these are:
 Air  🜁
 Earth 🜃
 Fire 🜂
 Water 🜄

Seven 

The seven metals known since Classical times in Europe were associated with the seven classical planets; this figured heavily in alchemical symbolism. The exact correlation varied over time, and in early centuries bronze or electrum were sometimes found instead of mercury, or copper for Mars instead of iron; however, gold, silver, and lead had always been associated with the Sun, Moon, and Saturn.
The associations below are attested from the 7th century and had stabilized by the 15th. They started breaking down with the discovery of antimony, bismuth, and zinc in the 16th century. Alchemists would typically call the metals by their planetary names, e.g. "Saturn" for lead, "Mars" for iron; compounds of tin, iron, and silver continued to be called "jovial", "martial", and "lunar"; or "of Jupiter", "of Mars", and "of the moon", through the 17th century. The tradition remains today with the name of the element mercury, where chemists decided the planetary name was preferable to common names like "quicksilver", and in a few archaic terms such as lunar caustic (silver nitrate) and saturnism (lead poisoning).
 Lead, corresponding with Saturn ♄
 Tin, corresponding with Jupiter ♃
 Iron, corresponding with Mars ♂
 Gold, corresponding with the Sun ☉ 🜚 ☼
 Copper, corresponding with Venus ♀
 Quicksilver, corresponding with Mercury ☿
 Silver, corresponding with the Moon ☽ or ☾ ( or ) [also 🜛 in Newton]

Mundane elements and later metals

 Antimony ♁, also 
 Arsenic 🜺
 Bismuth ♆ (in Newton), 🜘 (in Bergman)
 Cobalt  (approximately 🜶) (in Bergman)
 Magnesium ⚩ (in Newton), ⊛
 Manganese  (in Bergman)
 Nickel  (in Bergman; previously used for regulus of sulfur)
 Oxygen  (in Lavoisier)
 Phlogiston  (in Bergman)
 Phosphorus  or 
 Sulfur 🜍
 Zinc  (in Bergman)

Alchemical compounds

The following symbols, among others, have been adopted into Unicode.
 Acid, vinegar 🜊
 Sal ammoniac (ammonium chloride) 🜹
 Aqua fortis (nitric acid) 🜅, A.F.
 Aqua regia (nitro-hydrochloric acid) 🜆, 🜇, A.R.
 Spirit of wine (concentrated ethanol; called aqua vitae or spiritus vini) 🜈, S.V. or 🜉
 Amalgam (alloys of a metal and mercury) 🝛
 Cinnabar (mercury sulfide) 🜓
 Ferrous sulfate ⚨
 Vinegar (distilled) 🜋
 Vitriol (sulfates) 🜖
 Black sulphur (residue from sublimation of sulfur) 🜏

Alchemical processes

The alchemical magnum opus was sometimes expressed as a series of chemical operations. In cases where these numbered twelve, each could be assigned one of the Zodiac signs as a form of cryptography.  The following example can be found in Pernety's Dictionnaire mytho-hermétique (1758):

 Calcination (Aries ) ♈︎
 Congelation (Taurus ) ♉︎
 Fixation (Gemini ) ♊︎
 Solution (Cancer ) ♋︎
 Digestion (Leo ) ♌︎
 Distillation (Virgo ) ♍︎
 Sublimation (Libra ) ♎︎
 Separation (Scorpio ) ♏︎
 Ceration (Sagittarius ) ♐︎
 Fermentation (Capricorn ) ♑︎ (Putrefaction)
 Multiplication (Aquarius ) ♒︎
 Projection (Pisces ) ♓︎

Units
Several symbols indicate units of time.
 Day 🝰
 Hour 🝮

Unicode

The Alchemical Symbols block was added to Unicode in 2010 as part of Unicode 6.0.

See also
Other symbols commonly used in alchemy and related esoteric traditions:
 
 
 
 
 Circled dot (disambiguation) 
 
 
 
 
 
 , as used by Hermetic theurgists

Footnotes

References

Works cited

External links

 wikt:Appendix:Unicode/Alchemical Symbols
 Alchemical symbols in Unicode 14.0

 
Lists of symbols